Valonia  may refer to:
 Valonia (alga), an algae genus in the family Valoniaceae
 Valonia (spider), a spider genus in the family Sparassidae
 Valonia oak (Quercus macrolepis), a tree species used in tanning
 Valonia (fly), a signal fly, described by David McAlpine, 2001 in the family Platystomatidae (Diptera)

See also
 Vallonia

Genus disambiguation pages